The 2011 Atlanta Tennis Championships was a men's tennis tournament played on outdoor hard courts. It was the 24th edition of the event known that year as the Atlanta Tennis Championships and was part of the ATP World Tour 250 series of the 2011 ATP World Tour. The Atlanta Tennis Championships was the first ATP stop of the 2011 US Open Series. First-seeded Mardy Fish won the singles title.

ATP entrants

Seeds

*Seedings based on the July 11, 2011 rankings.

Other entrants
The following players received wildcards into the singles main draw:
  Robby Ginepri
  Tommy Haas
  Donald Young

The following players received entry from the qualifying draw:

  Marinko Matosevic
  Rajeev Ram
  Phillip Simmonds
  Yūichi Sugita

Finals

Singles

 Mardy Fish defeated  John Isner, 3–6, 7–6(8–6), 6–2.
It was Fish's first title of the year, sixth career title, and second consecutive title at the event.

Doubles

 Alex Bogomolov Jr. /  Matthew Ebden defeated  Matthias Bachinger /  Frank Moser, 3–6, 7–5, [10–8].

References

External links
 Official website
 Singles main draw

2011 ATP World Tour
2011
2011 in sports in Georgia (U.S. state)
July 2011 sports events in the United States